Jimmy Miller is an American football coach.  He is the defensive coordinator at the University of Northwestern – St. Paul.  Miller served as the head football coach at the Northwestern for 10 seasons, from 1991 to 2000, compiling a record of 46–50.

References

Exterternal links
 Northwestern profile

Year of birth missing (living people)
Living people
American football defensive backs
Bethel Royals football coaches
Bethel Royals football players
Northwestern Eagles football coaches